
Xiangzhou may refer to:

Xiangzhou District, Zhuhai, Guangdong
Xiangzhou District, Xiangyang, Hubei
Xiangzhou County, subdivision of Laibin, Guangxi
Xiangzhou Subdistrict (zh), Chengqu, Shanwei, Guangdong

Towns
Xiangzhou, Tiandong County, subdivision of Tiandong County, Guangxi
Xiangzhou, Xiangzhou County, subdivision and seat of Xiangzhou County, Guangxi
Xiangzhou, Shandong, subdivision of Zhucheng, Shandong

Historical prefectures
Xiang Prefecture (Guangxi), a prefecture between the 6th and 20th centuries in modern Guangxi
Xiang Prefecture (Hubei), a prefecture between the 6th and 12th centuries in modern Hubei
Xiang Prefecture (Henan), a prefecture between the 6th and 12th centuries in modern Henan and Hebei

See also
Xiang (disambiguation)